Santasabuj Das is an Indian medical doctor, molecular immunologist, bioinformatician and a scientist at the National Institute of Cholera and Enteric Diseases, Kolkata. He is known for his studies on the pathogenesis of various types of infections caused by Salmonella in humans and is an elected fellow of the West Bengal Academy of Science and Technology. He is a former Fulbright scholar and a life member of the Probiotic Association of India, the Society of Biological Chemists, India and the Indian Science Congress Association. The Department of Biotechnology of the Government of India awarded him the National Bioscience Award for Career Development, one of the highest Indian science awards, for his contributions to biosciences, in 2011.

Biography 

Born in the Indian state of West Bengal, Santasabuj Das did his medical studies at the University of Calcutta from where he earned an MBBS in 1990 and an MD in 1996. He started his career as a research associate at the division of cellular immunology of the Indian Institute of Chemical Biology but moved to complete his residency at the Sanjay Gandhi Postgraduate Institute of Medical Sciences. Subsequently, he served as a post-doctoral fellow at the National Center for Biological Sciences from 1998 and in 2000, he moved to the US to work as a post doctoral fellow at the Kimmel Cancer Center of the Thomas Jefferson University. In 2002, he joined the Molecular Oncology Research Institute of the Tufts Medical Center as a post-doctoral research associate where he stayed until 2004. On his return to India, he joined the National Institute of Cholera and Enteric Diseases, Kolkata as a grade C scientist in 2005 and holds the positions of a grade E scientist and assistant director. He has also been serving as a senior scientist of the Indian Council of Medical Research since 2013.

Professional profile 
Das' research focus is on the various types of infections caused by Salmonella in humans and he has done studies in the fields of pathogenesis of Salmonella Typhi and vaccine development against the pathogen. He holds two international and one national patent for the processes he has developed. His studies have been documented by way of a number of articles and through chapters contributed to books published by others. He is the coordinator for the Biomedical Informatics Centre of the National Institute of Cholera and Enteric Diseases and is a life member of the Society of Biological Chemists, India, the Indian Science Congress Association and the Probiotic Association of India.

Awards and honors 
The Department of Biotechnology (DBT) of the Government of India awarded him the National Bioscience Award for Career Development, one of the highest Indian science awards in 2011. The Bureau of Educational and Cultural Affairs (ECA) of the United States Department of State selected him for the Fulbright scholarship in 2012. The West Bengal Academy of Science and Technology elected him as a fellow in 2016.

Selected bibliography

Chapters

Articles

See also 

 TLR5
 Eukaryote

Notes

References

External links 
 
 
 

N-BIOS Prize recipients
Indian scientific authors
Living people
Indian medical researchers
Scientists from West Bengal
University of Calcutta alumni
Thomas Jefferson University alumni
Tufts University School of Medicine alumni
Indian immunologists
Indian bioinformaticians
Indian patent holders
Indian Council of Medical Research
1968 births
21st-century Indian inventors